Qilla Abdullah or Killa Abdullah or Abdullah Qilla is the name of a historic fort (qilla) built by Sardar Abdullah Khan Ahmedzai (1716–1731), a Khan of Kalat.

It is located in the Killa Abdullah District of Balochistan Province, in southwestern Pakistan.

References

Forts in Balochistan

Qila Abdullah District